Migron may refer to:

 Migron, Charente-Maritime, a commune in France
 Migron, Mateh Binyamin, an Israeli outpost